A Vessel Identification System allows users of radar to see a ship's name, IMO (International Maritime Organization) number, course, speed, destination, and sometimes flag and dimensions, next to a ship-like icon on a computer or radar screen. A comparatively new innovation designed to improve inter-vessel communication, reduce reliance on visual contact and VHF radio chatter, and enable more efficient traffic control and reduce the incidence of collision.

Ship management